{{DISPLAYTITLE:C20H28N2O5}}
The molecular formula C20H28N2O5 (molar mass: 376.447 g/mol, exact mass: 376.1998 u) may refer to:

 Enalapril
 Remifentanil

Molecular formulas